Yakiimo may refer to:

 Roasted sweet potato, a popular street food in East Asia
 JCPM Yakiimo Station, an astronomical observatory station at Shimizu, Japan